Houghton and Sunderland South is a constituency represented in the House of Commons of the UK Parliament since its creation in 2010 by Bridget Phillipson of the Labour Party. 

In the 2010 and 2015 general elections, it was the first constituency to declare its result, continuing the record of its predecessor seat, Sunderland South, in the four general elections from 1992 to 2005. However, in the 2017 and 2019 general elections, it was beaten by Newcastle upon Tyne Central.

Constituency profile 
Houghton and Sunderland South is a medium density inland area, partly situated on the south banks of the River Wear, which is mostly populated by people of working age, and a minority of the population living in rural villages. The majority of the population historically relied on coal mining, steelworks and shipbuilding from the mid-nineteenth to mid-twentieth centuries on Wearside, with Tyne and Wear at the forefront of some of the earliest Labour Party activity, and several of its earliest Members of Parliament. The largest opposition vote has come from the Conservative Party.

Boundaries 

The City of Sunderland wards of Copt Hill, Doxford, Hetton, Houghton, St Chad's, Sandhill, Shiney Row, and Silksworth.

Houghton and Sunderland South was created for the 2010 general election when the Boundary Commission reduced the number of seats in Tyne and Wear from 13 to 12, with the constituencies in the City of Sunderland, in particular, being reorganised. The constituency was formed from the majority of the former Houghton and Washington East seat (Copt Hill, Doxford, Hetton, Houghton and Shiney Row wards) and parts of the former Sunderland South seat (St Chad's, Sandhill and Silksworth wards).

Members of Parliament

Elections

Elections in the 2010s

See also 
 List of parliamentary constituencies in Tyne and Wear
 History of parliamentary constituencies and boundaries in Tyne and Wear

Notes

References 

Parliamentary constituencies in Tyne and Wear
Politics of the City of Sunderland
Constituencies of the Parliament of the United Kingdom established in 2010